The 4th Critics' Choice Documentary Awards were presented on November 10, 2019. at the BRIC in Brooklyn, New York, honoring the finest achievements in documentary filmmaking and non-fiction television, the ceremony was hosted by Jonathan Scott. The nominees were announced in October 14, 2019, with The Biggest Little Farm leading the nominations with seven.

Special awards
At the ceremony, director Michael Apted received "The Landmark Award", and filmmaker Frederick Wiseman was presented as the recipient for "The D A Pennebaker Award" (previously called the Critics’ Choice Lifetime Achievement Award).

Winners and nominees

Films by multiple nominations and wins

The following films received multiple nominations:

The following films received multiple awards:

See also
92nd Academy Awards
72nd Primetime Creative Arts Emmy Awards

References

2019 film awards
Critics' Choice Documentary Awards